In Hinduism, the first guru of the Nimbarka Sampradaya is Sri Hansa Bhagwan, who is regarded one of the twenty-four incarnations of Vishnu within the tradition. At the beginning of creation, in the Satya Yuga, Vishnu Himself took the form of a quadrangle, joined conch shells, chakras, maces, and lotuses, and descended to the sage Sankadi, the son of Brahma, in the name of Hansabata.
 

 
It is said in Srimad-Bhagavatam that Brahma created his own Manasputra, Sanak, Sananda, Sanatkumar and Sanatan, and advised them to spread the people. But they were reluctant to indulge in worldly affairs, so they sought advice from Father Brahma to get rid of this worldly world. Father Brahma was then overwhelmed by the powerful menstrual cycle as he was busy with the work of creation, so he was unable to advise the Sankadi sages on theology. Then he meditated on Vishnu and called him for this deed. Srivagavan then descended in the form of a swan and sent the Sankadi sages on the path of liberation by advising them on theology.

Uddhav Bani in Lord Krishna Srimad-Bhagavatam  
Tasyahang hansarupena sakasamagamanga then. (Srimadbhagavatam, 11.13.19)
 
That is - then I came to him in the form of a swan. Lord Krishna said again -
 
Janit magatang yajnang yusmaddharmaribakshaya. (Srimadbhagavatam, 11.13.38)
 
That is, come to know me as Vishnu, who came in the form of a swan to preach your religion (Sankadi sage is called the swan god).
 
Mention of the Bhagavad-gita in the true age is found elsewhere in Srimad-Bhagavatam.
 
Krite shuklachaturbahurjatilo balkalambarah.
 
Krishnajinopabitakshan bibraddanda kamandalu.
 
Hansah suparno baikuntho dharmo yogeshvaromal.
 
Ishwar: Purusho: Vyakta: Paramatmeti Giyate. (Srimadbhagavatam, 11.5.21,23)
 
That is to say - in the Satya Yuga, Srivagavan became white-colored, quadrangular, braided, clothed, clothed in black, deer-skinned, upavita, aksamala and danda, and kamandalu. In that true age, Srivagavan became known as Hansa, Suparna, Vaikuntha, Ishvara, Purusha, Abyakta, and Paramatma.
Gopal Sahasranama and Vishnu Sahasranama hymns also mention a name of Srivagavan as "Hansa". E.g. -
 
Achyutah Keshabo Vishnurhari: Satyo Janardanah.
 
Hanso Narayano Lilo Nilo Bhakti Parayanah. (Gopal Sahasranam, 65)
 
Maricirdamano hansah suparno bhujagottamah.
 
Hiranyanabha: Sutapa: Padmanabha: Butterfly. (Vishnu Sahasranama, 21)
 
The meaning of the word hansa is - hanso, like kshtirnibibechane sakstastatha: sau sarvajnyadyanantagunashaktyadimatben janjanjmadibyaparakartattrva-chchetanachetanyorbibechananipunyabaniti. (Mantrahasyatika)

In other words “the Sri Hansa is Bhagwan  
Just as a goose is able to understand the difference between milk and water, so is this goose who has omniscient and eternal qualities and is the master of the creation of the worldSimply put - just as a swan renounces water from a mixture of milk and water and accepts fertilizer milk, so does a goose separate the external vain unconscious world from the soul involved in the subject and the sensory world by accepting the fertilized soul as its inner consciousnessAble to give advice of self-knowledge.There is another interpretation of the word hansa - hantiti hansa (hanti iti hansa). When the word "hanti" means to kill or destroy, the word hans means - "soham" meaning - "I am that".
 
The swan, the incarnation of Vishnu, descended in the Satya Yuga and gave the Sankadi sages the liberating theology and took the place of the first and eternal Sadguru in our community.

Hamsa Gita  
The Swan Gita (Sanskrit) (also known as Uddhav Gita) consists of Krishna's final speech to Uddhav before he finishes his earthly 'Avataran' (Sanskrit: अवतार) and 'Entertainment' (Sanskrit: लीला). Although the Uddhav Gita is often published as a solo work, it is also found in the eleventh canto of the Bhagavata Purana that sections 40 to 8 begin at the end, containing more than 1000 verses (Sanskrit: शलोक) and as part of the Puranas. Is considered.The discourse contains a story of Avadhuta and although the name of this personality is not explicitly mentioned in the Bhagavata Purana as a whole, the Vaishnava tradition and the larger traditional religion describe this agency as Dattatreya.

Manuscripts and texts  
The names Uddhav Gita and Hamsa Gita are popularly interchangeable but the Hamsa Gita also specifically refers to a subset of the Uddhav Gita and the Bhagavata Purana.

Naming, theory and etymology  
Hamsa Gita (Sanskrit) (also referred to as Uddhav Gita) where Hamsa is a metaphor for Paramahamsa and at the same time a natural teacher of clear mercy in nature. Hamsa (hansa in Sanskrit and often written) is a swan or duck, often considered a silent swan, but really a bar-headed duck. It is used as a symbol and a decorative element in Indian culture. 'Git' (literally the word "song" in Sanskrit; Devanagari).

English speech  
Tigunite (2002: pp. 39–45) In the Uddhav Gita, Dattatreya translated the narrations of 24 teachers into English. Although scholars agree that the Bhagavata Purana is a composite work of many oral traditions, the Vaishnava tradition and the Bhagavata Purana itself believe that it was written by Vyasadeva. It is said that the narrator of the Hamsa Gita is Rishi Shuka, the son of Byas Deva. It is important to note that although the work is composite, it does not show a "... lack of coordination or compactness that should identify the work performed by many authors ...""Forward to Brown and Saraswati" (20: p. 8) and then Upadhyay further states that whatever the poet of the Hamsa Gita and Bhagavata Purana, he is a poet who uses patterns and metaphors in a complex work of art. Haig (2006: p. 128) framed his import as a model of environmental education in the opening paragraph of his work on the Uddhav Gita:
 
Sri Dattatreya, who is quoted in the Lord Krishna Uddhav Gita, has emerged as a guru for environmental education. Sri Dattatreya gained knowledge by observing the world, which was given to him by twenty-four instructors. These taught him the futility of spiritual addiction, the benefits of thought and tolerance, and a path to the highest spiritual self-realization. Sri Dattatreya, the incarnation of Vishnu, is featured in several Puranas where his teachings involve a direct challenge to students ’tendencies and superstitions. Its main message is “never judge by the appearance of the surface but always seek a deeper truth”: the world is sacred, an aspect of God, and a puzzle that challenges the spiritual soul to awaken to its true nature.
 
Paramahansa (2006: Apaginakara) organizes a Swedish Gita literature under the supervision of Srimad Bhagavatam and maintains that these are all songs of Manizism:
 
"The Gita in Srimad Bhagavatam proposes Uddhav-Gita, Rudra-Gita, Bhikshu-Gita, Shruti-Gita, Hamsa-Gita Manizm as the essence of their philosophy.
 
Upadhyaya, Forward to Brown and Saraswati (20: p. 6) thinks that Saraswati (this is Ambikananda) who herself is a monk and has taken this ashram from a very young age, writes as follows:
 
Swami Ambikananda's success in transforming his work into a metric composition is a tribute to the versatility of Sanskrit and the clarity of the original writing. His translation method is characterized by two considerations. He sought to find close equivalents, keeping in mind both the formal and dynamic aspects of language; And the purpose of his explanatory translation is to point out the complete naturalness of the expression, the way the reader behaves in the context of his own culture.
 
Brown and Saraswati (20: p. 14) think that Venkatesananda (1921–1972) and his guru Shivananda (18-1983) opened their hearts to this work:
 
Swami Shivananda and Swami Venkatesananda opened my heart to this sacred book, and their teachings enabled me to translate it, trying to convey its message to all spiritual saints.

Extra link 
 Nimbarka Sampradaya
 Hamsa Gita

Hindu monasticism
Vishnu